Regional elections were held in Denmark in March 1921. 10403 municipal council members were elected.

References

1921
1921 elections in Europe
Elections